Pepper Dagenhart Culpepper (born 1 October 1968) is an American political scientist.

Culpepper obtained a bachelor of arts in political science at Duke University in 1990. He received a Marshall Scholarship, with which he pursued a Master of Letters in political science at Oxford University, graduating in 1992. Culpepper returned to the United States, enrolling at Harvard University, where he completed a master of arts and doctorate both in political science. He began teaching at Harvard in 1998 as an assistant professor of public policy, one year before obtaining his Ph.D. Culpepper became an associate professor in 2003. He left Harvard in 2009, for a position at the European University Institute. Culpepper moved to the University of Oxford in 2016, as a professorial fellow of Trinity College, Oxford and professor of politics and public policy. In 2018, Culpepper became a professorial fellow of Nuffield College, Oxford, and was appointed the Blavatnik Professor of Government and Public Policy within the Blavatnik School of Government.

Culpepper's book Quiet Politics and Business Power: Corporate Control in Europe and Japan (Cambridge University Press, 2011) was awarded the 2012 Stein Rokkan Prize for Comparative Social Science Research.

References

1968 births
Living people
American political scientists
American expatriate academics
Expatriate academics in the United Kingdom
American expatriates in the United Kingdom
American expatriates in Italy
21st-century social scientists
Duke University Trinity College of Arts and Sciences alumni
Harvard Graduate School of Arts and Sciences alumni
Alumni of the University of Oxford
Marshall Scholars
Academic staff of the European University Institute
Harvard University faculty
Fellows of Nuffield College, Oxford
Fellows of Trinity College, Oxford
Winners of the Stein Rokkan Prize for Comparative Social Science Research